The 1979–80 NBA season was the Spurs' fourth season in the NBA, the 7th in San Antonio, and the 13th season as a franchise.

Draft picks

Roster

Regular season

Season standings

z - clinched division title
y - clinched division title
x - clinched playoff spot

Record vs. opponents

Game log

Playoffs

|- align="center" bgcolor="#ffcccc"
| 1
| April 2
| @ Houston
| L 85–95
| George Gervin (19)
| Gervin, Kenon (9)
| Gervin, Olberding (4)
| The Summit14,454
| 0–1
|- align="center" bgcolor="#ccffcc"
| 2
| April 4
| Houston
| W 106–101
| George Gervin (44)
| Mark Olberding (12)
| Mike Gale (9)
| HemisFair Arena12,894
| 1–1
|- align="center" bgcolor="#ffcccc"
| 3
| April 6
| @ Houston
| L 120–141
| George Gervin (37)
| John Shumate (8)
| George Gervin (6)
| The Summit15,676
| 1–2
|-

Player statistics

Season

Playoffs

Awards and records
George Gervin, All-NBA First Team

Transactions

References

See also
1979-80 NBA season

San Antonio Spurs seasons
San
1979 in sports in Texas
San Antonio Spurs